Angélica Gorodischer (28 July 1928 – 5 February 2022) was an Argentine writer who was known for her short stories, which belong to a wide variety of genres, including science-fiction, fantasy, crime and stories with a feminist perspective.

Biography
Gorodischer was born in Buenos Aires on 28 July 1928. She lived in Rosario from the age of eight, and this city appeared very frequently in her work. In 2007 the city council of Rosario awarded her the title of Illustrious Citizen.

In the English-speaking world Gorodischer might be best known for Kalpa Imperial (In Argentina volume 1 appeared in 1983 and both volumes by 1984). Its English translation came in 2003 by United States speculative fiction author Ursula K. Le Guin. A collection of short stories, it details the history of a vast imaginary empire through tales of fantasy, fable, and allegory. A part of the work appeared as a story in the American anthology Starlight 2.

She also produced many works before Kalpa Imperial including the collections Opus dos [Opus two, 1967], Bajo las jubeas en flor [Under the Flowering Jubeas, 1973], and Casta Luna Electrónica [Chaste Electric Moon, 1977].
She was a science fiction author noted for her work about the differences of power among men and women. She focused on the pros and cons of people in power and wrote about corrupt rulers.

Gorodischer was author of two novels within the genre of detective fiction. Her detective persona is a female grand dame who reluctantly and haphazardly engages in the world of international intrigue. She made her literary debut in 1985 in Gorodischer's short fictional tale or noveleta entitled Floreros de alabastro, alfombras de Bokhara, reappearing later in different form in Jugo de mango (1988).

She died on 5 February 2022, at the age of 93.

Works 
 Cuentos con soldados. Santa Fe: Premio Club del Orden, 1965. (stories)
 Opus dos. Buenos Aires: Ediciones Minotauro, 1967. (novel)
 Las pelucas. Buenos Aires: Editorial Sudamericana, 1968. (stories)
 Bajo las jubeas en flor. Buenos Aires: Ediciones De La Flor, 1973. (stories)
 Casta luna electrónica. Buenos Aires: Ediciones Andrómeda, 1977. (stories)
 Trafalgar. El Cid Editor, Buenos Aires, 1979. (stories)
 Kalpa imperial. Buenos Aires: Ediciones Minotauro, 1983. (stories)
 Mala noche y parir hembra. Buenos Aires: Ediciones La Campana, 1983. (stories)
 Floreros de alabastro, alfombras de Bokhara. Lyndhurst, NJ: Lectorum Publications, 1985. (novel)
 Jugo de mango. Buenos Aires: Emecé Editores, 1988. (novella)
 Las repúblicas. Buenos Aires: Ediciones de la Flor, 1991. (stories)
 Fábula de la virgen y el bombero. Buenos Aires: Editiones de la Flor, 1993. (novel)
 Mujeres de palabra. San Juan: University of Puerto Rico Press, 1994.
 Prodigios. Barcelona: Ed. Lumen, 1994. (novel)
 Técnicas de supervivencia. Rosario: Ed. Municipal Rosario, 1994. (stories)
 La noche del inocente. Buenos Aires: Emecé Editores, 1996. (novel)
 Cómo triunfar en la vida. Buenos Aires: Emecé, 1998. (stories)
 "The End of a Dynasty." Chapter from Kalpa Imperial. Translated by Ursula K. Le Guin. In Starlight 2. Edited by Patrick Nielsen Hayden. New York: Tor, 1999.
 
 Tumba de jaguares. Buenos Aires: Emecé Editores, 2005. (novel)

Translations into English 
Kalpa Imperial: The Greatest Empire That Never Was. Translated by Ursula K. Le Guin. Small Beer Press, 2003. 
Trafalgar. Translated by Amalia Gladhart. Small Beer Press, 2013.  
Prodigies. Translated by Sue Burke. Small Beer Press, 2015.  
Jaguars' Tomb. Translated by Amalia Gladhart. Vanderbilt University Press, 2021.

References

1928 births
2022 deaths
People from Rosario, Santa Fe
Argentine science fiction writers
Women science fiction and fantasy writers
World Fantasy Award-winning writers
Argentine women novelists
Writers from Buenos Aires
International Writing Program alumni
Feminist writers
Argentine feminists